Penicillium stolkiae is a species of fungus in the genus Penicillium.

References

Further reading 
 

stolkiae
Fungi described in 1968